The OMAC Project is a six-issue American comic book limited series written by Greg Rucka with art by Jesus Saiz and published by DC Comics in 2005.

Overview
The book is one of four miniseries leading up to DC Comics' Infinite Crisis event. The series directly follows the Countdown to Infinite Crisis special, picking up the story where the special left off. The OMACs mentioned in the title borrow their name and general appearance from the 1974 Jack Kirby creation OMAC. However, the OMACs in this 2005 miniseries differ from the original in other ways, including the term underlying the acronym that forms their name: in Kirby's stories, "OMAC" stands for "One-Man Army Corps", while in this miniseries, "OMAC" stands for "Observational Metahuman Activity Construct" (constructed backwards from the Kirby acronym as a form of backronym).

In the miniseries, OMACs are people scattered across the world who harbor invasive technology in their bodies but do not know it. When activated, the technology can be used to spy on the human hosts' surroundings, control their bodies or transform any of them into one of a visually identical set of remote-controlled superhuman beings. The human hosts of the OMAC technology act as unwitting sleeper agents for former Justice League associate Maxwell Lord.

The OMACs are guided by the "Brother Eye" satellite, as in the original 1974 Kirby stories. In this 2005 miniseries, however, Brother Eye differs from its 1974 inspiration. This miniseries portrays Brother Eye as an artificially intelligent spy satellite originally built by Batman, not to control the OMACs, but to observe the members of the Justice League. Before the beginning of the miniseries, Maxwell Lord has already secretly captured Brother Eye from Batman and turned the satellite toward the end of coordinating the OMACs that Lord now controls.

Lord uses the OMACs and Brother Eye to stalk and attack the world's superheroes and supervillains, with the avowed goal of reasserting humanity's control over the world. The OMAC Project ends with an autonomous, intelligent Brother Eye satellite commanding over 200,000 OMACs and seemingly planning war on the world's superheroes, starting with the worldwide broadcast of Maxwell Lord's death at the hands of Wonder Woman.

The OMAC Project has numerous tie-ins with other titles, including Action Comics #829; Adventures of Superman #642; Aquaman #35; Birds of Prey #83; Firestorm #18; JSA #76; Hawkman #46; Manhunter #13-14; Robin #143-144; Superman #217-219 and 222; and Wonder Woman #219-221.

Series plot summary

Blue Beetle is dead, Booster Gold is in the hospital, and the Checkmate organization, led by Maxwell Lord, continues its mysterious operations against DC's superheroes. Booster Gold wakes up and, after learning of Ted Kord's disappearance, decides to investigate with the help of Wonder Woman.

OMACs (Observational Meta-human Activity Constructs) have been spotted all over the world and have managed to kill several metahumans. Batman and Wonder Woman investigate the OMACs while Booster, after meeting Guy Gardner in space, decides that he would rather investigate Ted Kord's disappearance with other former members of the Justice League International.

Interwoven through this plot are scenes detailing the power struggle within the Checkmate organization itself. Checkmate is led by the White Queen, White King, Black Queen and Black King, each of whom have Knights of corresponding color. Through his machinations, Black King Maxwell Lord becomes the only leader of the organization, despite being double-crossed by one of his own Knights, Sasha Bordeaux.

Lord is then killed by Wonder Woman (in the pages of Wonder Woman #219) to prevent him from continuing to direct the actions of a mind-controlled Superman. Brother Eye, the artificial intelligence directing the OMAC drones, initiates a protocol specifically designed to be used in the event of Lord's death and OMAC drones worldwide begin to wreak havoc and destruction.

Sasha herself is transformed into an OMAC-like being, powered by nanotechnology. Rocket Red #4, a former member of the Justice League Europe, sacrifices himself in order to destroy several drones and save the lives of his friends.

Batman and Sasha then work with the remnants of Checkmate and other government organizations to lure the majority of OMACs to the Sahara Desert. There, as OMACs gather to attack a large number of gathered heroes, Batman activates an EMP device that disables all of the OMACs, allowing their human hosts to be freed. The Brother Eye satellite however is still hidden and has about 200,000 OMAC's still under its control.

Brother Eye overrides all television screens around the world and broadcasts Wonder Woman's killing of Maxwell Lord. People do not understand the circumstances, only that they are watching Wonder Woman murder a recognized Justice League colleague.

As the series closes, Brother Eye prepares to launch an all-out war against metahumans to protect humanity. Batman works furiously to disable his rogue creation, while Wonder Woman and the Amazons of Themyscira face international backlash over Diana's brutal means. Brother Eye's campaign against the Amazons leads into Infinite Crisis #1.

The OMAC Project: Infinite Crisis Special #1 - "The Lazarus Protocol"

In The OMAC Project: Infinite Crisis Special #1, which takes place after Infinite Crisis #6, Brother Eye has crash-landed in the Rub Al-Khali Desert in southern Saudi Arabia, taking possession of two local sentries. Sasha Bordeaux, returning from the successful attack against Brother Eye in space, is requested by Batman to track down the remains of the satellite (containing information on countless metahumans) and destroy it.

Meanwhile, President Jonathan Vincent Horne is being debriefed on the Brother Eye situation by Amanda Waller. Afterwards, he appoints Waller as acting Black King of Checkmate until further notice. In the desert, local forces try to gain control of the downed machinery, but are eliminated by a behemoth OMAC created from the two sentries.

In Switzerland, Jessica Midnight is communicating with Mr. Bones, Director of DEO, when she is quickly interrupted and cut off by Amanda Waller (flanked by Fire). Waller demands to know what's currently happening, having Fire put the "heat" on Midnight as well as announcing herself as Midnight's new superior.

While the Israeli, Russian and Chinese governments begin measures to retrieve the satellite, Brother Eye attempts to remote link to Sasha and take control of her body, but it fails. Sasha arrives at a Checkmate safehouse and attempts to make contact with Midnight at headquarters, but is stopped by Waller, who demands to know if Sasha is an OMAC or not. Sasha does not know. Waller demands Sasha to return to base, but Sasha says she will not. Waller then instructs Fire to stop Brother Eye from being reactivated, even if it means killing Sasha or Midnight. When Fire protests such lethal commandments, Waller jabs at her with remarks on what she did for her people in Brazil before gaining her powers and how much she enjoyed it.

As all of the factions reach the downed satellite, Sasha rushes through the ensuing battle to detonate explosives from within Brother Eye's CPU chamber. The computer nearly succeeds in downloading its programming and data files over Sasha's mind when she activates the explosives. Searching the wreckage, Fire and Midnight find Sasha alive and free of the nanobots that she was infected with.

Collected editions
The series was collected, along with Countdown to Infinite Crisis and Wonder Woman #219, in a trade paperback in November 2005.

References 

2005 comics debuts
Infinite Crisis
Comics by Greg Rucka
Cyborg comics
Comics about artificial intelligence